van de Venne is a surname. Notable people with the surname include:

Adriaen van de Venne (1589–1662), Dutch Golden Age painter
Delphine Van de Venne (born 1974), Belgian sprint canoer
Jan van de Venne, Flemish Baroque painter

See also
Venne (disambiguation)

Surnames of Dutch origin